Khokhlovo is a rural locality (a selo) in Valuysky District, Belgorod Oblast, Russia. The population was 335 as of 2010. There are 9 streets.

Geography 
Khokhlovo is located 18 km northwest of Valuyki (the district's administrative centre) by road. Terekhovo is the nearest rural locality.

References 

Rural localities in Valuysky District